The 1926 Horta earthquake, occurred at 8:42 a.m. (local time) on 31 August. It caused the destruction of many of the buildings located in the city of Horta, the central group of the Portuguese autonomous region of the Azores, resulting in the death of nine and the partial or complete destruction of 4,138 buildings.

Earthquake 
From April 1926 onwards, the island of Faial was rocked by a series of tremors that increased in intensity, until 5 April. On this date, a singular event resulted in destruction or damage to buildings in the civil parishes of Flamengos, Ribeirinha and Conceição, in particular in the localitiesof Farrobo, Lomba and Espalhafatos.

The earthquake progressed to a Mercalli Intensity of X (Extreme) in the northern part of Horta (around Conceição). The shock resulted in the death of nine people, with 200 injured, and the general destruction of many of the heritage buildings located in that region of the city.

The greatest damage occurred in the urban parish of Conceição and rural parishes of Praia do Almoxarife (where of the 220 homes, only 16 continued to be habitable), Flamengos, Feteira and Castelo Branco, in addition to the areas between Lomba do Pilar and Salão. In all, approximately 4,138 homes were partially or totally destroyed.

See also 
 List of earthquakes in 1926
 List of earthquakes in the Azores

References
 
 
 
 

History of the Azores
1926 in Portugal
Earthquakes in Portugal
1926 earthquakes